Pakenham is a surname of Old English origin. It is a locational surname from Pagham, Sussex, or Pakenham, Suffolk.

 Antonia Pakenham, maiden name and early pen-name of author Antonia Fraser
 Edward Pakenham (1778–1815), British general
 Sir Francis Pakenham (diplomat) (1832–1905), British envoy to Chile, Argentina and Sweden
 The Hon. Sir Michael Pakenham (born 1943), retired British diplomat
 Sir Richard Pakenham (1797 – 1868), British diplomat of Anglo-Irish background
 Thomas Pakenham (disambiguation), several people including:
 Thomas Pakenham (Royal Navy officer) (1757–1836), British admiral
 William Christopher Pakenham (1861–1933), British admiral
 the surname of several Earls of Longford
 the Baronets of Pakenham

References

Surnames of Old English origin
English toponymic surnames